According to a 2012 survey by Statistics Canada, around 3.8 million adult Canadians reported being "limited in their daily activities due to a disability". This represented 13.7% of the adult population. The three most-prevalent forms of disability in Canada are chronic pain issues, mobility, and flexibility limitations. Around 11% of Canadian adults experience one of these disability types, and 40% of those people have had all three at the same time. Disabled people in Canada have historically experienced many forms of discrimination and abuse, such as segregation, institutionalization, and compulsory sterilization. They were not given the same rights as non-disabled people until the end of the 1970s, when the Coalition of Provincial Organizations of the Handicapped (now Council for Canadians with Disabilities) initiated significant changes. Legislation intended to protect disabled Canadians include the Charter of Rights and Freedoms, the Canadian Human Rights Act, and the Employment Equity Act.

History

Largely having to do with the widespread trust of medical authority and the growth of industrialization, Canadian society during the late 19th and early 20th centuries fostered the segregation of persons with disabilities. Public institutions, such as psychiatric hospitals, houses for the blind, houses of refuge, and church-run homes, confined and isolated persons with disabilities from the rest of society. Persons with disabilities were seen as being a burden on the rest of society and denied the full exercise of their rights.

War wounded
After World War I, many veterans returned to Canada with disabilities due to war injuries and had difficulty re-integrating into society. The needs of these veterans gave rise to disability advocacy organizations such as the War Amps, which fought for the need for services like rehabilitation, training in sheltered workshops, and other employment-related services. A disparity formed between the status of veterans with disabilities and that of civilians with disabilities, which would continue to widen until after World War II. In the mid-20th century, civilians with disabilities and their allies advocated for the rights of all persons with disabilities to participate fully in society. The deinstitutionalization of persons with disabilities was among their primary causes.

Compulsory sterilization

From the end of the 1920s and into the 1970s, provincial legislation in Alberta and British Columbia allowed for persons with mental health disabilities who had been institutionalized to be sterilized for the purpose of preventing them from having children who would inherit the same disabilities. While legislation in British Columbia required the consent of the person in question, their spouse, or a guardian, a 1937 amendment to the Sexual Sterilization Act of Alberta meant that, in certain circumstances, this procedure could be completed without the consent or even the knowledge of the person being sterilized. In Alberta, this legislation was repealed in 1972 under the Progressive Conservative government of Peter Lougheed. David King, the MLA who had tabled the bill for the repeal of the Act, stated that he saw the legislation as being in violation of human rights. In British Columbia, legislation permitting sterilization was repealed in 1973, and the E (Mrs) v Eve Supreme Court decision in 1986 affirmed that, in Canada, it is not legal to sterilize someone without their consent outside of emergency situations.

Deinstitutionalization
During the 1950s and 1960s, the process continued for the deinstitutionalization of persons with disabilities. Not-for-profit organizations such as the Canadian Association for Community Living (formed in 1958, then called the Canadian Association for Retarded Children) opened group homes for persons with disabilities and advocated that money saved by closing government institutions could be used for the expansion of community services.

Disability rights organizations
The end of the 1970s marked the establishment of the Coalition of Provincial Organizations of the Handicapped (now the Council for Canadians with Disabilities [CCD]), a prominent advocacy group. This organization stood out from others in that it was composed mainly of persons with disabilities themselves, rather than allies or professionals.

In 1981 the United Nations International Year for Disabled Persons drew attention to and triggered an increase in Canadians' awareness of disability issues. The following year the Charter of Rights and Freedoms was amended to include disability as a basis for discrimination, a cause strongly advocated by stakeholder groups such as the CCD. Canada's Human Rights Act came into effect in 1985, and the Employment Equity Act in 1986.

As a result of the economic recession, the early 1990s marked a difficult time for persons with disabilities: less funding was made available for social assistance and government subsidies were scarce and more difficult to obtain. Developments on disability issues continued to be made at a federal level. In 1991, under the Mulroney government, a five-year strategic action plan was announced for the Integration of Persons with Disabilities. In 1996 Prime Minister Jean Chrétien appointed a Federal Task Force on Disability Issues. The federal government Office for Disability Issues, the Government of Canada's focal point on matters with relation to disability, was founded in 2001. The 1990s marked the emergence of an academic discourse aimed at determining the place of disability in Canadian society....

Twenty-first century developments in disability issues include a 2012 Supreme Court decision which established that persons with mental-health disabilities can provide reliable court testimony, and Canada's ratification of the UN Convention on the Rights of Persons with Disabilities in March 2010. In signing the convention, Canada committed to attempting to improve the social and economic condition of Canadians with disabilities, and in 2014 it submitted a report to the UN detailing its progress.

Policies

Legislation 
At the federal level, Canada has the Accessible Canada Act  exclusively dedicated to protecting the rights of Canadians with disabilities in areas of federal jurisdiction. </ref> Canadians with disabilities can additionally find prominent protection in the Charter of Rights and Freedoms which applies to all levels of jurisdiction in Canada, the Canadian Human Rights Act, and the Employment Equity Act. Discrimination against persons with disabilities is prohibited by the Canadian Human Rights Act, which was enacted in 1985.  In addition, the Charter of Rights and Freedoms, enacted in 1982, guarantees that persons with disabilities are protected by and will receive the same benefits under the law as any other Canadian. Canada is thus the only country in the World explicitly protecting people with disabilities from discrimination in their constitution. The Employment Equity Act aims to ensure that particular groups, including persons with disabilities, enjoy the same employment opportunities and benefits as anyone else.

Programs 
The Stephen Harper government adopted a wide array of programs designed to make life more affordable for people with disabilities. These include the creation of Registered Disability Savings Plans in 2006, the Accessibility Fund in 2007 and Tax-free free Disability Savings Account in 2008. In light of the COVID-19 pandemic, the Justin Trudeau government proposed enhancing these programs with increased funding, including reinstating the Canada Revenue Agency’s Disability Advisory Committee. 

Other financial programs for Canadians with disabilities currently offered by Employment and Social Development Canada include:

 Canada Pension Plan disability benefits,
 Canada Pension Plan children's benefits,
 Disability benefits for Veterans,
 the Child Disability Benefit,
 the Federal excise gasoline tax refund program,
 the Canada Disability Savings Grant,
 the Canada Disability Savings Bond,
 the Grant for services and equipment for students with permanent disabilities,
 the Canada student loans program - severe permanent disability benefit, and
 Grants for students with permanent disabilities

Environmental sensitivity
The Canadian Human Rights Commission maintains a policy on "environmental sensitivity" (a recognized disability) which gives affected employees the right to request that their employer ensures workplaces are free from egregious chemicals or smells.

Provincial policies 
Most Canadian provinces and territories adopted disability support programs similar to the Ontario Disability Support Program. Ontario also adopted the Accessibility for Ontarians with Disabilities Act in 2005 but within that policy there is a clause called undue hardship which allows continued discrimination against persons with disabilities based on financial grounds.

Demographics
According to the 2012 Canadian Survey on Disability by Statistics Canada, about 3.8 million or 13.7% of Canadians aged 15 to 64 were regarded as disabled. There is a correlation between disability and age, from 4.4% of those aged 15 24 to 42.5% among those 75 and older.

Education
Only 20.2% of Canadians with disabilities have a university degree compared to 40.7% of their non-disabled compatriots.

Income inequality and employment
Disabled men aged 15-to-64 earn $9,557 less than non-disabled men of the same age. In the case of disabled women in the same age-group the income difference is $8,853. In 2006 the unemployment rate among disabled Canadians was 8.6%, compared to the national average of 6.3%.

Social inclusion
According to a 2004 survey, 10% of Canadians believe disabled people are fully included in Canadian social life. About 1.4 million disabled adults required assistance with activities of daily living in 2006.

See also
 Accessibility for Ontarians with Disabilities Act, 2005
 The Accessibility for Manitobans Act
 Accessible Canada Act

References